St Joseph's Senior Secondary School (SJS), in Rihand nagar, was opened in July 1984. It was established and is managed by Roman Catholic Diocese of Allahabad Pvt. Ltd., of which the Bishop of Allahabad is the Director-General who is the president of the Education Society which runs a number of schools in urban and rural areas catering to various sections of people. This branch of St. Joseph's School provides enormous help to the siblings of the NTPC, Rihand employees.

This school is run for the National Thermal Power Corporation Limited (NTPC) at Rihand Nagar (RhSTPP), Sonebhadra District. - Uttar Pradesh. The School is affiliated with the Central Board of Secondary Education (CBSE), New Delhi. Its staff includes the sisters of the Institute of the Blessed Virgin Mary (IBMV), now known as Congregation of Jesus (CJ) as its core group.

Motto
The motto of this school is "To spread the light of truth and justice".

Information

External links
Official website

High schools and secondary schools in Uttar Pradesh
Catholic secondary schools in India
Christian schools in Uttar Pradesh
Buildings and structures in Sonbhadra district
Educational institutions established in 1984
1984 establishments in Uttar Pradesh
Education in Sonbhadra district